Kompas Multimedia Towers is a complex of 3 towers, named Menara Kompas I, II and III, which is situated at Gelora, Tanah Abang, Central Jakarta, Indonesia. The complex has a land area of about 1.2 hectares. Tower I has a height of 92 meters and 18 floors, tower II has height of 138 meters and 27 floors, and tower III has height of 226 meters and 52 floors. Construction of Tower I and II was completed in 2017. Construction of tower III is expected to be completed by 2018.

See also

List of tallest buildings in Indonesia
 List of tallest buildings in Jakarta

References

Towers in Indonesia
Buildings and structures in Jakarta
Skyscrapers in Jakarta
Post-independence architecture of Indonesia
Skyscraper office buildings in Indonesia
Kompas Gramedia Group